Udelnaya is a station on Line 2 of the Saint Petersburg Metro. It opened on 4 November 1982.

Architecture
At the end of the platform, there is a memorial plaque dedicated to Vladimir Lenin when he passed here when escaping Finland.

Saint Petersburg Metro stations
Railway stations in Russia opened in 1982
1982 establishments in the Soviet Union
Railway stations located underground in Russia